The Ari Synagogue is situated on Or HaHaim Street in the Armenian Quarter of the Old City of Jerusalem. It is located on the ground floor of a building which also houses the Ohr ha-Chaim Synagogue and Old Yishuv Court Museum. It is named after Rabbi Isaac Luria, (1534–1572), who was known as the Ari (trans: The Lion), an acronym for haEloqi Rabbeinu Yitzhak (the divine, our teacher, Isaac). He was a great  kabbalist who founded a new school in Kabbalistic thought, known as the "System of the Ari" or "Lurianic kabbalah".

Origins
According to tradition, it was in this building where Rabbi Isaac Luria was born and where he lived for 20 years. It is told that Eliyahu Ha-Navi was the sandek at his Brit milah. At some stage, the room of his traditional birthplace became a Sephardic synagogue. The Jews of the yishuv were forbidden by Ottoman Law to establish any new synagogues. This led to inconspicuous prayer houses which, like the Ari Synagogue, were located in residential homes. During the riots of 1936 the synagogue was looted and burned.

See also
 Ari Ashkenazi Synagogue (Safat)
 Oldest synagogues in the world

References

Synagogues in Jerusalem
Isaac Luria

he:מוזיאון חצר היישוב הישן#בית הכנסת האר"י